Clarence George Carter (born January 14, 1936) is an American  singer, songwriter, musician and record producer. His most successful songs include "Slip Away", "Back Door Santa" (both released 1968), "Patches" (1970) and "Strokin" (1986).

Early life
Born blind in Montgomery, Alabama on January 14, 1936, Carter attended the Alabama School for the Blind in Talladega, Alabama, and Alabama State University in Montgomery, graduating in August 1960 with a Bachelor of Science degree in music.

Career 
His professional music career began with friend Calvin Scott, signing to the Fairlane label to release "I Wanna Dance But I Don't Know How", as Clarence & Calvin, the following year.  After the 1962 release of "I Don't Know (School Girl)," the pair joined Duke Records, renaming themselves the C & C Boys and releasing four singles for the label, though none were commercially successful. In 1965, the duo recorded "Step by Step" at Rick Hall's FAME Studios in Muscle Shoals; it was released on the Atlantic Records' subsidiary Atco label, but it also failed to chart.

The duo performed regularly in clubs in Birmingham, Alabama in 1966.  After Scott was seriously injured in an auto accident, Carter continued as a solo singer, and recorded for the Fame label.  In 1967 he recorded "Tell Daddy", which reached number 35 on the Billboard R&B chart and inspired Etta James' answer record, "Tell Mama", for which Carter was credited as writer.  At the end of 1967, Carter joined Atlantic Records.  He then began a string of hits on the R&B and pop charts, starting with "Slip Away" (number 2 R&B, number 6 pop), which has been described as "a superior cheating ballad spotlighting his anguished, massive baritone alongside the remarkably sinuous backing of Fame's exemplary backing band", and "Too Weak To Fight" (number 3 R&B, number 13 pop).  Both of the preceding Atlantic singles were certified Gold by the Recording Industry Association of America. At the end of 1968, he had a seasonal pop hit with the raunchy and funky "Back Door Santa" (number 4 Christmas pop), and toured nationally.  His backing singers included Candi Staton; they married in 1970 and produced a son, Clarence Carter Jr., before divorcing in 1973.

Carter continued to have hits in 1969 and 1970, with "Snatching It Back", "The Feeling Is Right", "Doin' Our Thing", and "I Can't Leave Your Love Alone" all reaching both the US pop and R&B charts.  The B-side of "Snatching It Back" was a remake of a remake of James Carr's "The Dark End of the Street", entitled "Making Love (At the Dark End of the Street". Carter's biggest hit came in 1970 with his version of "Patches", first recorded by Chairmen of the Board, which was a UK number 2 hit and a US number 4.  The record sold over one million copies, and received a gold disc awarded by the R.I.A.A. in September 1970, just two months after its release, and won the Grammy Award for Best R&B Song in 1971.  Following "Slip Away" and "Too Weak to Fight", it was Carter's third million-seller.  However, Carter's later record releases were less successful, and he left Atlantic at the end of 1971 to rejoin the Fame label.  In 1975 he signed to ABC Records, releasing three albums including Loneliness and Temptation.  According to writer Brian Ward, Carter "virtually made a career from tales of unbridled love and illicit sex..."

With the advent of disco in the mid-1970s, Carter's career suffered.  After the birth of another son, Herbert Deon Wilkerson in 1981, he signed for Ichiban Records in 1985 and found a new audience with songs such as "Strokin'" and "Dr. C.C." in the 1980s and 1990s.  "Strokin'" was reputedly deemed too ribald for a public release or radio play, so the record company placed the records in jukeboxes, where bar patrons discovered the song.  "Strokin'" was given further acclaim when it was used in the Eddie Murphy remake of The Nutty Professor.  It was most recently used in William Friedkin's film Killer Joe.  Carter's soul sound also found an audience within the then-nascent hip-hop community.  Most notably, the horn break from "Back Door Santa" is sampled in the Run-D.M.C. Christmas song "Christmas in Hollis".

Carter's later songs continue to appeal to a primarily African-American working-class audience that is also interested in contemporary blues artists such as Denise LaSalle, Bobby Rush, Marvin Sease and Sir Charles Jones.  He has continued recording, releasing six albums for the Ichiban label and, since 1996, establishing his own Cee Gee Entertainment label.  He has also continued to tour regularly in the Southern states and internationally.

Discography

Chart singles

Note

Albums
 
 1968 This is Clarence Carter
 1969 Testifyin' 
 1969 The Dynamic Clarence Carter
 1970 Patches
 1971 That's What Your Love Means to Me
 1973 Sixty Minutes
 1974 Real
 1975 Loneliness & Temptation
 1976 Heart Full of Song
 1977 I Got Caught Making Love
 1980 Let's Burn
 1981 Mr. Clarence Carter in Person
 1982 Love Me with a Feeling
 1982 Patches
 1984 Singing for My Supper
 1985 Messin' with My Mind
 1986 Dr. C.C.
 1987 Hooked on Love
 1989 Touch of Blues
 1990 Between a Rock and a Hard Place
 1991 Dr. CC's Greatest Prescriptions: The Best Of
 1992 Have You Met Clarence Carter...Yet?
 1994 Live with the Dr.
 1995 Together Again
 1995 I Couldn't Refuse
 1996 Carter's Corner
 1997 Too Weak to Fight
 1999 Bring it to Me
 2001 Live in Johannesburg
 2003 All Y'all Feeling Alright
 2005 One More Hit
 2007 Messin' with My Mind
 2007 The Final Stroke
 2007 I'm Easy (compilation album)
 2009 On Your Feet
 2010 A Christmas Party
 2011 Sing Along with Clarence Carter
 2015 Dance to the Blues
 2020 Mr. Old School

References

External links
 
 [ Clarence Carter] at Allmusic
 

Living people
Musicians from Montgomery, Alabama
Blind musicians
African-American male singer-songwriters
American soul singers
Alabama State University alumni
Atlantic Records artists
1936 births
21st-century African-American male singers
20th-century African-American male singers
Singer-songwriters from Alabama